A list of films produced in Turkey in 1971 (see 1971 in film):

See also
1971 in Turkey

References

Lists of Turkish films
1971